OSM may refer to:

Software and websites
 OpenStreetMap, an open source project to develop free geographic data
 OpenStreetMap Foundation, a British non-profit foundation
 OsmAnd, a map and navigational application for Android and iOS based on data from OpenStreetMap
 Open Service Mesh, a free and open source cloud native service mesh

Organizations
 Austrian Student Mission
 Office of Surface Mining, a branch of the US Department of the Interior
 OSM TV, a Bosnian commercial television channel
 Montreal Symphony Orchestra, a Canadian symphony orchestra

Science
 Oncostatin M, a protein
 Osmole (unit), a unit of osmotic concentration 
 Osmotic avoidance abnormal protein, for example OSM-9

Transportation
 Honda OSM, a 2008 Japanese concept sports car
 Mosul International Airport, Iraq, IATA airport code
 OS-M, a series of space launch rockets from OneSpace

Other uses
 Operational Service Medal (disambiguation), multiple campaign medals
 Order of the Secret Monitor, an appendant order of Freemasonry
 O.S.M., the post-nominal letters used by members of the Servite Order